Dato' Law Choo Kiang (born 5 September 1970) is a Malaysian politician who has served as Speaker of the Penang State Legislative Assembly since June 2013. He served as Member of the Penang State Executive Council (EXCO) in the Pakatan Rakyat (PR) and Pakatan Harapan (PH) state administrations under former Chief Minister Lim Guan Eng from March 2008 to May 2013 and Member of the Penang State Legislative Assembly (MLA) for Bukit Tambun from March 2008 to May 2018. He is a member of the People's Justice Party (PKR), a component party of the state ruling but federal opposition PH and formerly PR coalitions.

Education
He obtained his formal education from Jit Sin Independent High School, Bukit Mertajam and his Bachelor of Business Administration from the National Taipei University, Taiwan in 1994. He has also obtained postgraduate degree in Mass Communication from Shanghai University.

Political career
He joined National Justice Party (formerly known, prior changing to People's Justice Party) in 2000. He was appointed as the Chairman of People's Justice Party's Communication Bureau. He was the Chairman for People's Justice Party's branch of Bukit Mertajam.

Law Choo Kiang was appointed as a Penang Exco member to handle Agricultural and Non-Urban Development portfolio in 2008. He was appointed as speaker for the Penang State Legislative Assembly in 2013.

Election results

Honours
  :
  Companion of the Order of the Defender of State (DMPN) – Dato’ (2013)

References

External links
Law Choo Kiang blog
Penang State Legislative Assembly Speaker

Living people
People from Penang
1970 births
People's Justice Party (Malaysia) politicians
Malaysian politicians of Chinese descent
Shanghai University alumni
National Chung Hsing University alumni
Members of the Penang State Legislative Assembly
Penang state executive councillors
Speakers of the Penang State Legislative Assembly